South Korea, officially the Republic of Korea (ROK), is a country in East Asia. It constitutes the southern part of the Korean Peninsula and shares a land border with North Korea. The country's western border is formed by the Yellow Sea, while its eastern border is defined by the Sea of Japan. South Korea claims to be the sole legitimate government of the entire peninsula and adjacent islands. It has a population of 51.75 million, of which roughly half live in the Seoul Capital Area, the fourth most populous metropolitan area in the world. Other major cities include Incheon, Busan, and Daegu.

The Korean Peninsula was inhabited as early as the Lower Paleolithic period. Its first kingdom was noted in Chinese records in the early 7th century BCE. Following the unification of the Three Kingdoms of Korea into Silla and Balhae in the late 7th century, Korea was ruled by the Goryeo dynasty (918–1392) and the Joseon dynasty (1392–1897). The succeeding Korean Empire (1897–1910) was annexed in 1910 into the Empire of Japan. Japanese rule ended following Japan's surrender in World War II, after which Korea was divided into two zones; a northern zone occupied by the Soviet Union and a southern zone occupied by the United States. After negotiations on reunification failed, the southern zone became the Republic of Korea in August 1948 while the northern zone became the socialist Democratic People's Republic of Korea the following month.

In 1950, a North Korean invasion began the Korean War, which saw extensive American-led United Nations intervention in support of the South, while China intervened to support the North, with Soviet assistance. After the war's end in 1953, the country entered into a military alliance with the U.S., which continues to this date, and its devastated economy began to soar, recording the fastest rise in average GDP per capita in the world between 1980 and 1990. Despite lacking natural resources, the nation rapidly developed to become one of the Four Asian Tigers based on international trade and economic globalization, integrating itself within the world economy with export-oriented industrialization; currently being one of the largest exporting nations in the world, along with having one of the largest foreign-exchange reserves in the world. The June Democratic Struggle led to the end of authoritarian rule in 1987 and the country is now considered among the most advanced democracies in Asia, with the highest level of press freedom on the continent.

South Korea is a regional power and a highly developed country, with its economy being ranked as the world's thirteenth-largest by nominal GDP and the fourteenth-largest by GDP (PPP). It ranks nineteenth globally by Human Development Index, and has the third-highest life expectancy in the world. In recent years, the country has been facing an aging population and the lowest fertility rate in the world. South Korea's citizens enjoy one of the world's fastest Internet connection speeds and the densest high-speed railway network. The country is the world's ninth-largest exporter and ninth-largest importer. Its armed forces are ranked as one of the world's strongest militaries, with the world's second-largest standing army by military and paramilitary personnel. In 21st century, South Korea has been renowned for its globally influential pop culture, particularly in music (K-pop), TV dramas (K-dramas) and cinema, a phenomenon referred to as the Korean wave. It is a member of the OECD's Development Assistance Committee, the G20, the IPEF, and the Paris Club.

Etymology 

The name Korea derives from the name Goryeo. The name Goryeo itself was first used by the ancient kingdom of Goguryeo, which was considered a great power of East Asia during its time, in the 5th century as a shortened form of its name. The 10th-century kingdom of Goryeo succeeded Goguryeo, and thus inherited its name, which was pronounced by the visiting Arab and Persian merchants as "Korea". The modern name of Korea, appears in the first Portuguese maps of 1568 by João vaz Dourado as Conrai  and later in the late 16th century and early 17th century as Korea (Corea) in the maps of Teixeira Albernaz of 1630.

The kingdom of Goryeo became first known to Westerners when Afonso de Albuquerque conquered Malacca in 1511 and described the peoples who traded with this part of the world known by the Portuguese as the Gores. Despite the coexistence of the spellings Corea and Korea in 19th century publications, some Koreans believe that Imperial Japan, around the time of the Japanese occupation, intentionally standardized the spelling on Korea, making Japan appear first alphabetically.

After Goryeo was replaced by Joseon in 1392, Joseon became the official name for the entire territory, though it was not universally accepted. The new official name has its origin in the ancient kingdom of Gojoseon (2333 BCE). In 1897, the Joseon dynasty changed the official name of the country from Joseon to Daehan Jeguk (Korean Empire). The name Daehan (Great Han) derives from Samhan (Three Han), referring to the Three Kingdoms of Korea, not the ancient confederacies in the southern Korean Peninsula. However, the name Joseon was still widely used by Koreans to refer to their country, though it was no longer the official name. Under Japanese rule, the two names Han and Joseon coexisted. There were several groups who fought for independence, the most notable being the Provisional Government of the Republic of Korea ( / ).

Following the surrender of Japan, in 1945, the "Republic of Korea" ( / , IPA: ,) was adopted as the legal English name for the new country. However, it is not a direct translation of the Korean name. As a result, the Korean name "Daehan Minguk" is sometimes used by South Koreans as a metonym to refer to the Korean ethnicity (or "race") as a whole, rather than just the South Korean state. Conversely, the official name of North Korea in English, the "Democratic People's Republic of Korea", is a direct translation of the Korean name.

Since the government only controlled the southern part of the Korean Peninsula, the informal term "South Korea" was coined, becoming increasingly common in the Western world. While South Koreans use Han (or Hanguk) to refer to both Koreas collectively, North Koreans and ethnic Koreans living in China and Japan use the term Joseon instead.

History

Ancient Korea 

The Korean Peninsula was inhabited as early as the Lower Paleolithic period. The history of Korea begins with the founding of Joseon (also known as "Gojoseon", or Old Joseon, to differentiate it with the 14th century dynasty) in 2333 BCE by Dangun, according to Korea's foundation mythology. Gojoseon was noted in Chinese records in the early 7th century. Gojoseon expanded until it controlled the northern Korean Peninsula and parts of Manchuria. Gija Joseon was purportedly founded in the 12th century BCE, but its existence and role have been controversial in the modern era. In 108 BCE, the Han dynasty defeated Wiman Joseon and installed four commanderies in the northern Korean peninsula. Three of the commanderies fell or retreated westward within a few decades. As Lelang commandery was destroyed and rebuilt around this time, the place gradually moved toward Liaodong. Thus, its force was diminished and it only served as a trade center until it was conquered by Goguryeo in 313.

Three Kingdoms of Korea 
During the period known as the Proto–Three Kingdoms of Korea, the states of Buyeo, Okjeo, Dongye and Samhan occupied the whole Korean peninsula and southern Manchuria. From them, Goguryeo, Baekje and Silla emerged to control the peninsula as the Three Kingdoms of Korea. Goguryeo, the largest and most powerful among them, was a highly militaristic state, and competed with various Chinese dynasties during its 700 years of history. Goguryeo experienced a golden age under Gwanggaeto the Great and his son Jangsu, who both subdued Baekje and Silla during their times, achieving a brief unification of the Three Kingdoms of Korea and becoming the most dominant power on the Korean Peninsula. In addition to contesting for control of the Korean Peninsula, Goguryeo had many military conflicts with various Chinese dynasties, most notably the Goguryeo–Sui War, in which Goguryeo defeated a huge force said to number over a million men. Baekje was a great maritime power; its nautical skill, which made it the Phoenicia of East Asia, was instrumental in the dissemination of Buddhism throughout East Asia and continental culture to Japan. Baekje was once a great military power on the Korean Peninsula, especially during the time of Geunchogo, but was critically defeated by Gwanggaeto the Great and declined. Silla was the smallest and weakest of the three, but it used cunning diplomatic means to make opportunistic pacts and alliances with the more powerful Korean kingdoms, and eventually Tang China, to its great advantage.

The unification of the Three Kingdoms by Silla in 676 led to the North South States Period, in which much of the Korean Peninsula was controlled by Later Silla, while Balhae controlled the northern parts of Goguryeo. Balhae was founded by a Goguryeo general and formed as a successor state to Goguryeo. During its height, Balhae controlled most of Manchuria and parts of the Russian Far East, and was called the "Prosperous Country in the East". Later Silla was a golden age of art and culture, as evidenced by the Hwangnyongsa, Seokguram, and Emille Bell. Relationships between Korea and China remained relatively peaceful during this time. Later Silla carried on the maritime prowess of Baekje, which acted like the Phoenicia of medieval East Asia, and during the 8th and 9th centuries dominated the seas of East Asia and the trade between China, Korea and Japan, most notably during the time of Jang Bogo; in addition, Silla people made overseas communities in China on the Shandong Peninsula and the mouth of the Yangtze River. Later Silla was a prosperous and wealthy country, and its metropolitan capital of Gyeongju was the fourth largest city in the world. Buddhism flourished during this time, and many Korean Buddhists gained great fame among Chinese Buddhists and contributed to Chinese Buddhism, including: Woncheuk, Wonhyo, Uisang, Musang, and Kim Gyo-gak, a Silla prince whose influence made Mount Jiuhua one of the Four Sacred Mountains of Chinese Buddhism. However, Later Silla weakened under internal strife and the revival of Baekje and Goguryeo, which led to the Later Three Kingdoms period in the late ninth century.

Unified dynasties 

In 936, the Later Three Kingdoms were united by Wang Geon, a descendant of Goguryeo nobility, who established Goryeo as the successor state of Goguryeo. Balhae had fallen to the Khitan Empire in 926, and a decade later the last crown prince of Balhae fled south to Goryeo, where he was warmly welcomed and included into the ruling family by Wang Geon, thus unifying the two successor nations of Goguryeo. Like Silla, Goryeo was a highly cultural state, and invented the metal movable type printing press. After defeating the Khitan Empire, which was the most powerful empire of its time, in the Goryeo–Khitan War, Goryeo experienced a golden age that lasted a century, during which the Tripitaka Koreana was completed and there were great developments in printing and publishing, promoting learning and dispersing knowledge on philosophy, literature, religion, and science; by 1100, there were 12 universities that produced famous scholars and scientists. However, the Mongol invasions in the 13th century greatly weakened the kingdom. Goryeo was never conquered by the Mongols, but exhausted after three decades of fighting, the Korean court sent its crown prince to the Yuan capital to swear allegiance to Kublai Khan, who accepted, and married one of his daughters to the Korean crown prince. Henceforth, Goryeo continued to rule Korea, though as a tributary ally to the Mongols for the next 86 years. During this period, the two nations became intertwined as all subsequent Korean kings married Mongol princesses, and the last empress of the Yuan dynasty was a Korean princess. In the mid-14th century, Goryeo drove out the Mongols to regain its northern territories, briefly conquered Liaoyang, and defeated invasions by the Red Turbans. However, in 1392, General Yi Seong-gye, who had been ordered to attack China, turned his army around and staged a coup.

Yi Seong-gye declared the new name of Korea as "Joseon" in reference to Gojoseon, and moved the capital to Hanseong (one of the old names of Seoul). The first 200 years of the Joseon dynasty were marked by peace, and saw great advancements in science and education, as well as the creation of Hangul by Sejong the Great to promote literacy among the common people. The prevailing ideology of the time was Neo-Confucianism, which was epitomized by the seonbi class: nobles who passed up positions of wealth and power to lead lives of study and integrity. Between 1592 and 1598, Toyotomi Hideyoshi launched invasions of Korea, but his advance was halted by Korean forces (most notably the Joseon Navy led by Admiral Yi Sun-sin and his renowned "turtle ship") with assistance from Righteous Army militias formed by Korean civilians, and Ming dynasty Chinese troops. Through a series of successful battles of attrition, the Japanese forces were eventually forced to withdraw, and relations between all parties became normalized. However, the Manchus took advantage of Joseon's war-weakened state and invaded in 1627 and 1637, and then went on to conquer the destabilized Ming dynasty. After normalizing relations with the new Qing dynasty, Joseon experienced a nearly 200-year period of peace. Kings Yeongjo and Jeongjo particularly led a new renaissance of the Joseon dynasty during the 18th century. In the 19th century, the royal in-law families gained control of the government, leading to mass corruption and weakening of the state, and severe poverty and peasant rebellions throughout the country. Furthermore, the Joseon government adopted a strict isolationist policy, earning the nickname "the hermit kingdom", but ultimately failed to protect itself against imperialism and was forced to open its borders. After the First Sino-Japanese War and the Russo-Japanese War, Korea was annexed by Japan (1910–1945). What followed was a period of forced assimilation, in which Korean language, culture, and history were suppressed.

Towards the end of World War II, the U.S. proposed dividing the Korean peninsula into two occupation zones (a U.S. and Soviet one). Dean Rusk and Charles H. Bonesteel III suggested the 38th parallel as the dividing line, as it placed Seoul under U.S. control. To the surprise of Rusk and Bonesteel, the Soviets accepted their proposal and agreed to divide Korea.

Modern history 

Despite the initial plan of a unified Korea in the 1943 Cairo Declaration, escalating Cold War antagonism between the Soviet Union and the United States eventually led to the establishment of separate governments, each with its own ideology, leading to the division of Korea into two political entities in 1948: North Korea and South Korea. In the South, Syngman Rhee, an opponent of communism, who had been backed and appointed by the United States as head of the provisional government, won the first presidential elections of the newly declared Republic of Korea in May. In the North, however, a former anti-Japanese guerrilla and communist activist, Kim Il-sung, was appointed premier of the Democratic People's Republic of Korea in September.

In October, the Soviet Union declared Kim Il-sung's government as sovereign over both parts. The UN declared Rhee's government as "a lawful government having effective control and jurisdiction over that part of Korea where the UN Temporary Commission on Korea was able to observe and consult" and the Government "based on elections which was observed by the Temporary Commission" in addition to a statement that "this is the only such government in Korea." Both leaders began an authoritarian repression of their political opponents inside their region, seeking for a unification of Korea under their control. While South Korea's request for military support was denied by the United States, North Korea's military was heavily reinforced by the Soviet Union.

Korean War 
On 25 June 1950, North Korea invaded South Korea, sparking the Korean War, the Cold War's first major conflict, which continued until 1953. At the time, the Soviet Union had boycotted the United Nations (UN), thus forfeiting their veto rights. This allowed the UN to intervene in a civil war when it became apparent that the superior North Korean forces would unify the entire country. The Soviet Union and China backed North Korea, with the later participation of millions of Chinese troops. After an ebb and flow that saw both sides facing defeat with massive losses among Korean civilians in both the north and the south, the war eventually reached a stalemate. During the war, Rhee's party promoted the One-People Principle, an effort to build an obedient citizenry through ethnic homogeneity and authoritarian appeals to nationalism.

The 1953 armistice, never signed by South Korea, split the peninsula along the demilitarized zone near the original demarcation line. No peace treaty was ever signed, resulting in the two countries remaining technically at war. Approximately 3 million people died in the Korean War, with a higher proportional civilian death toll than World War II or the Vietnam War, making it one of the deadliest conflicts of the Cold War era. In addition, virtually all of Korea's major cities were destroyed by the war.

Post-Korean War (1960–1990) 

In 1960, a student uprising (the "April 19 Revolution") led to the resignation of the autocratic then-President Syngman Rhee. This was followed by 13 months of political instability as South Korea was led by a weak and ineffectual government. This instability was broken by the 16 May 1961 coup led by General Park Chung-hee. As president, Park oversaw a period of rapid export-led economic growth enforced by political repression.

Park was heavily criticized as a ruthless military dictator, who in 1972 extended his rule by creating a new constitution, which gave the president sweeping (almost dictatorial) powers and permitted him to run for an unlimited number of six-year terms. The Korean economy developed significantly during Park's tenure.  The government developed the nationwide expressway system, the Seoul subway system, and laid the foundation for economic development during his 17-year tenure, which ended with his assassination in 1979.

The years after Park's assassination were marked again by political turmoil, as the previously suppressed opposition leaders all campaigned to run for president in the sudden political void. In 1979, General Chun Doo-hwan led the coup d'état of December Twelfth. Following the coup d'état, Chun Doo-hwan planned to rise to power through several measures. On 17 May, Chun Doo-hwan forced the Cabinet to expand martial law to the whole nation, which had previously not applied to the island of Jejudo. The expanded martial law closed universities, banned political activities, and further curtailed the press. Chun's assumption of the presidency through the events of 17 May triggered nationwide protests demanding democracy; these protests were particularly focused in the city of Gwangju, to which Chun sent special forces to violently suppress the Gwangju Democratization Movement.

Chun subsequently created the National Defense Emergency Policy Committee and took the presidency according to his political plan. Chun and his government held South Korea under a despotic rule until 1987, when a Seoul National University student, Park Jong-chul, was tortured to death. On , the Catholic Priests Association for Justice revealed the incident, igniting the June Democratic Struggle across the country. Eventually, Chun's party, the Democratic Justice Party, and its leader, Roh Tae-woo, announced the June 29 Declaration, which included the direct election of the president. Roh went on to win the election by a narrow margin against the two main opposition leaders, Kim Dae-jung and Kim Young-sam. Seoul hosted the Olympic Games in 1988, widely regarded as successful and a significant boost for South Korea's global image and economy.

South Korea was formally invited to become a member of the United Nations in 1991. The transition of Korea from autocracy to modern democracy was marked in 1997 by the election of Kim Dae-jung, who was sworn in as the eighth president of South Korea, on 25 February 1998. His election was significant given that he had in earlier years been a political prisoner sentenced to death (later commuted to exile). He won against the backdrop of the 1997 Asian Financial Crisis, where he took IMF advice to restructure the economy and the nation soon recovered its economic growth, albeit at a slower pace.

Contemporary South Korea 

In June 2000, as part of president Kim Dae-jung's "Sunshine Policy" of engagement, a North–South summit took place in Pyongyang, the capital of North Korea. Later that year, Kim received the Nobel Peace Prize "for his work for democracy and human rights in South Korea and in East Asia in general, and for peace and reconciliation with North Korea in particular". However, because of discontent among the population for fruitless approaches to the North under the previous administrations and, amid North Korean provocations, a conservative government was elected in 2007 led by President Lee Myung-bak, former mayor of Seoul. Meanwhile, South Korea and Japan jointly co-hosted the 2002 FIFA World Cup. However, South Korean and Japanese relations later soured because of conflicting claims of sovereignty over the Liancourt Rocks.

In 2010, there was an escalation in attacks by North Korea. In March 2010 the South Korean warship ROKS Cheonan was sunk leading to the death of 46 South Korean sailors, allegedly by a North Korean submarine. In November 2010 Yeonpyeong island was attacked by a significant North Korean artillery barrage, with 4 people dying. The lack of a strong response to these attacks from both South Korea and the international community (the official UN report declined to explicitly name North Korea as the perpetrator for the Cheonan sinking) caused significant anger with the South Korean public.

South Korea saw another milestone in 2012 with the first ever female president Park Geun-hye elected and assuming office. Daughter of another former president, Park Chung-hee, she carried on a conservative brand of politics. President Park Geun-hye's administration was formally accused of corruption, bribery, and influence-peddling for the involvement of close friend Choi Soon-sil in state affairs. There followed a series of massive public demonstrations from November 2016 and she was removed from office. After the fallout of President Park's impeachment and dismissal, new elections were held and Moon Jae-in of the Democratic party won the presidency, assuming office on 10 May 2017. His tenure saw an improving political relationship with North Korea, some increasing divergence in the military alliance with the United States, and the successful hosting of the Winter Olympics in Pyeongchang. In April 2018, former president Park Geun-hye was sentenced to 24 years in jail, because of abuse of power and corruption. The COVID-19 pandemic has affected the nation since 2020. That same year, South Korea recorded more deaths than births, resulting in a population decline for the first time on record.

In March 2022, Yoon Suk-yeol, the candidate of conservative opposition People Power Party, won a close election over Democratic Party candidate by the narrowest margin ever. On 10 May 2022, Yoon Suk-yeol was sworn in as South Korea's new president to succeed Moon.

On 29 October 2022, at least 153 people were crushed to death when a crowd surged in an alleyway during Halloween festivities in Seoul's Itaewon district. President Yoon declared a state of official national mourning.

Geography, climate and environment

Geography 

This mountainous peninsula is flanked by the Yellow Sea to the west, and the Sea of Japan to the east. Its southern tip lies on the Korea Strait and the East China Sea.

South Korea can be divided into four general regions: an eastern region of high mountain ranges and narrow coastal plains; a western region of broad coastal plains, river basins, and rolling hills; a southwestern region of mountains and valleys; and a southeastern region dominated by the broad basin of the Nakdong River. South Korea is home to three terrestrial ecoregions: Central Korean deciduous forests, Manchurian mixed forests, and Southern Korea evergreen forests.

South Korea's terrain is mostly mountainous, most of which is not arable. Lowlands, located primarily in the west and southeast, make up only 30% of the total land area.

About three thousand islands, mostly small and uninhabited, lie off the western and southern coasts of South Korea. The easternmost islands of South Korea include Ulleungdo and Liancourt Rocks (Dokdo/Takeshima), while Marado and Socotra Rock are the southernmost islands of South Korea.

South Korea has 20 national parks and popular nature places like the Boseong Tea Fields, Suncheon Bay Ecological Park, and the first national park of Jirisan.

Climate 

In the Köppen climate classification system, South Korea tends to have a humid continental climate and a humid subtropical climate, and is affected by the East Asian monsoon, with precipitation heavier in summer during a short rainy season called jangma (장마), which begins end of June through the end of July. Winter temperatures are higher along the southern coast and considerably lower in the mountainous interior. Summer can be uncomfortably hot and humid, with temperatures exceeding  in most parts of the country. South Korea has four distinct seasons; spring, summer, autumn and winter. Spring usually lasts from late March to early May, summer from mid-May to early September, autumn from mid-September to early November, and winter from mid-November to mid-March.

Rainfall is concentrated in the summer months of June through September. The southern coast is subject to late summer typhoons that bring strong winds, heavy rains and sometimes floods.

Environment 

During the first 20 years of South Korea's growth surge, little effort was made to preserve the environment. Unchecked industrialization and urban development have resulted in deforestation and the ongoing destruction of wetlands such as the Songdo Tidal Flat. However, there have been recent efforts to balance these problems, including a government run  five-year green growth project that aims to boost energy efficiency and green technology.

The green-based economic strategy is a comprehensive overhaul of South Korea's economy, utilizing nearly two percent of the national GDP. The greening initiative includes such efforts as a nationwide bike network, solar and wind energy, lowering oil dependent vehicles, backing daylight saving time and extensive usage of environmentally friendly technologies such as LEDs in electronics and lighting. The country – already the world's most wired – plans to build a nationwide next-generation network that will be 10 times faster than broadband facilities, in order to reduce energy usage.

The renewable portfolio standard program with renewable energy certificates runs from 2012 to 2022.
Quota systems favor large, vertically integrated generators and multinational electric utilities, if only because certificates are generally denominated in units of one megawatt-hour. They are also more difficult to design and implement than a Feed-in tariff. Around 350 residential micro combined heat and power units were installed in 2012.

In 2017, South Korea was the world's seventh largest emitter of carbon emissions and the fifth largest emitter per capita. The president Moon Jae-in pledged to reduce greenhouse gas emissions – which contribute to climate change – to zero in 2050.

Seoul's tap water recently became safe to drink, with city officials branding it "Arisu" in a bid to convince the public. Efforts have also been made with afforestation projects. Another multibillion-dollar project was the restoration of Cheonggyecheon, a stream running through downtown Seoul that had earlier been paved over by a motorway. One major challenge is air quality, with acid rain, sulfur oxides, and annual yellow dust storms being particular problems. It is acknowledged that many of these difficulties are a result of South Korea's proximity to China, which is a major air polluter. South Korea had a 2019 Forest Landscape Integrity Index mean score of 6.02/10, ranking it 87th globally out of 172 countries.

South Korea is a member of the Antarctic-Environmental Protocol, Antarctic Treaty, Biodiversity Treaty, Kyoto Protocol (forming the Environmental Integrity Group (EIG), regarding UNFCCC, with Mexico and Switzerland), Desertification, Endangered Species, Environmental Modification, Hazardous Wastes, Law of the Sea, Marine Dumping, Comprehensive Nuclear-Test-Ban Treaty (not into force), Ozone Layer Protection, Ship Pollution, Tropical Timber 83, Tropical Timber 94, Wetlands, and Whaling.

Government 

The South Korean government's structure is determined by the Constitution of the Republic of Korea. Like many democratic states, South Korea has a government divided into three branches: executive, judicial, and legislative. The executive and legislative branches operate primarily at the national level, although various ministries in the executive branch also carry out local functions. The judicial branch operates at both the national and local levels. Local governments are semi-autonomous, and contain executive and legislative bodies of their own. South Korea is a constitutional democracy.

The constitution has been revised several times since its first promulgation in 1948 at independence. However, it has retained many broad characteristics and with the exception of the short-lived Second Republic of South Korea, the country has always had a presidential system with an independent chief executive. Under its current constitution the state is sometimes referred to as the Sixth Republic of South Korea. The first direct election was also held in 1948.

Although South Korea experienced a series of military dictatorships from the 1960s until the 1980s, it has since developed into a successful liberal democracy. Today, the CIA World Factbook describes South Korea's democracy as a "fully functioning modern democracy". South Korea is ranked 45th on the Corruption Perceptions Index (9th in the Asia-Pacific region), with a score of 57 out of 100.

Administrative divisions 

The major administrative divisions in South Korea are eight provinces, one special self-governing province, six metropolitan cities (self-governing cities that are not part of any province), one special city and one special self-governing city.

Demographics 

In April 2016, South Korea's population was estimated to be around 50.8 million by National Statistical Office, with continuing decline of working age population and total fertility rate. In a further indication of South Korea's dramatic decline in fertility, in 2020 the country recorded more deaths than births, resulting in a population decline for the first time since modern records began. In 2021, the fertility rate stood at just 0.81 children per woman. The country is noted for its population density, which was an estimated 505 per square kilometer in 2015, more than 10 times the global average. Aside from micro-states and city-states, South Korea is the world's third most densely-populated country. In practice the population density in much of South Korea is higher than the national one, as most of the country's land is uninhabitable due to being used for other purposes such as farming. Most South Koreans live in urban areas, because of rapid migration from the countryside during the country's quick economic expansion in the 1970s, 1980s and 1990s. The capital city of Seoul is also the country's largest city and chief industrial center. According to the 2005 census, Seoul had a population of  inhabitants. The Seoul National Capital Area has  inhabitants (about half of South Korea's entire population) making it the world's second largest metropolitan area. Other major cities include Busan, Incheon, Daegu, Daejeon, Gwangju and Ulsan.

The population has also been shaped by international migration. After World War II and the division of the Korean Peninsula, about four million people from North Korea crossed the border to South Korea. This trend of net entry reversed over the next 40 years because of emigration, especially to North America through the United States and Canada.

South Korea is considered one of the most ethnically homogeneous societies in the world with ethnic Koreans representing approximately 96% of total population. Precise numbers are difficult to estimate since statistics do not record ethnicity and given many immigrants are ethnically Korean themselves, and some South Korean citizens are not ethnically Korean.

The percentage of foreign nationals has been growing rapidly since late 1990s. , South Korea had 1,413,758 foreign residents, 2.75 percent of the population; however, many of them are ethnic Koreans with a foreign citizenship. Regardless of the ethnicity, there are 28,500 US military personnel serving in South Korea, most serving a one-year unaccompanied tour (though approximately 10 percent serve longer tours accompanied by family), according to the Korea National Statistical Office. In addition, about 43,000 English teachers from English-speaking countries reside temporarily in Korea. Currently, South Korea has one of the highest rates of growth of foreign born population, with about 30,000 foreign born residents obtaining South Korean citizenship every year since 2010.

Large numbers of ethnic Koreans live overseas, sometimes in Korean ethnic neighborhoods also known as Koreatowns. The four largest diaspora populations can be found in China (2.3 million), the United States (1.8 million), Japan (0.85 million), and Canada (0.25 million).

South Korea's birth rate was the world's lowest in 2009, at an annual rate of approximately 9 births per 1000 people. Fertility saw some modest increase afterwards, but dropped to a new global low in 2017, with fewer than 30,000 births per month for the first time since records began and less than 1 child per woman in 2018. The average life expectancy in 2008 was 79.10 years, (which was 34th in the world) but by 2015 it had increased to around 81. South Korea has the steepest decline in working age population of the OECD nations. In 2015, National Statistical Office estimated that the population of the country will have reached its peak by 2035.

Education 

A centralized administration in South Korea oversees the process for the education of children from kindergarten to the third and final year of high school. The school year is divided into two semesters, the first of which begins at the beginning of March and ends in mid-July, the second of which begins in late August and ends in mid-February. The schedules are not uniformly standardized and vary from school to school. Most South Korean middle schools and high schools have school uniforms, modeled on western-style uniforms. Boys' uniforms usually consist of trousers and white shirts, and girls wear skirts and white shirts (this only applies in middle schools and high schools). The country adopted a new educational program to increase the number of their foreign students through 2010. According to the Ministry of Education, Science and Technology, the number of scholarships for foreign students in South Korea would have (under the program) doubled by that time, and the number of foreign students would have reached 100,000.

South Korea is one of the top-performing OECD countries in reading literacy, mathematics and sciences with the average student scoring 519, compared with the OECD average of 492, placing it ninth in the world. The country has one of the world's highest-educated labor forces among OECD countries. The country is well known for its highly feverish outlook on education, where its national obsession with education has been called "education fever". This obsession with education has catapulted the resource-poor nation consistently atop the global education rankings. In 2014, South Korea ranked second worldwide (after Singapore) in the national rankings of students' math and science scores by the Organization for Economic Cooperation and Development (OECD) .

Higher education is a serious issue in South Korean society, where it is viewed as one of the fundamental cornerstones of South Korean life. Education is regarded with a high priority for South Korean families, as success in education is often a source of honor and pride for families and within South Korean society at large, and is seen as a fundamental necessity to channel one's social mobility to ultimately improve one's socioeconomic position in South Korean society. South Koreans view education as the main propeller of social mobility for themselves and their family, as a gateway to the South Korean middle class. Often seen as the objective among many South Korean prospective university students, graduating from an elite South Korean university is the ultimate marker of prestige, high socioeconomic status, promising marriage prospects, and a respectable career path. The entrance into a top-tier higher educational institution leads to a prestigious, secure and well-paid white collar job with the government, banks, or a major South Korean conglomerate such as Samsung, Hyundai or LG Electronics. With incredible pressure on high school students to secure limited spots at the nation's most esteemed universities, its institutional reputation and alumni networks are strong predictors of future career prospects. The top three universities in South Korea, often referred to as "SKY", are Seoul National University, Korea University and Yonsei University. An average South Korean student's life revolves around education, with intensely cutthroat competition for top grades, pressure to succeed academically and being the top student in every core class is deeply ingrained in the psyche of South Korean students at a young age. Yet with only so many limited places at the nation's most prestigious universities and even far fewer job openings at top-tier companies to accommodate the glut of numerously highly-qualified university graduates competing for such openings that have flooded the job market, many young South Koreans remain disappointed and are often unwilling to lower their expectations with regards employment prospects with the result of many feeling as though they are underachievers. There is a major cultural taboo in South Korean society attached to those who have not achieved formal university education, where those who do not hold university degrees face social prejudice and are often condescendingly looked down by others with contempt as second-class citizens. This often results in fewer opportunities for employment, improvement of one's socioeconomic position and prospects for marriage.

In 2015, the country spent 5.1% of its GDP on all levels of education – roughly 0.8 percentage points above the Organization for Economic Co-operation and Development (OECD) average of 4.3%. A strong investment in education, a militant drive to achieve academic success, as well as the passion for scholarly excellence has helped the resource-poor country rapidly grow its economy over the past 60 years from a war-torn wasteland to a prosperous first-world country.

International reception regarding the South Korean education system has been divided. It has been praised for various reasons, including its comparatively high test results and its major role in generating South Korea's economic development, creating one of the world's most educated workforces. South Korea's highly enviable academic performance has persuaded British education ministers to actively remodel their own curriculums and exams to try to emulate Korea's militant drive and passion for scholarly excellence and high educational achievement and success. Former U.S. President Barack Obama has also praised the country's rigorous school system, where over 80 percent of South Korean high school graduates go on to university. The nation's high university entrance rate has created a highly skilled workforce, making South Korea among the most highly educated countries in the world with one of the highest percentages of its citizens holding a tertiary education degree. In 2017, the country ranked fifth for the percentage of 25 to 64 year old's that have attained tertiary education with 47.7 percent. In addition, 69.8 percent of South Koreans aged 25–34 have completed some form of tertiary education qualification, and bachelor's degrees are held by 34.2 percent of South Koreans aged 25–64, the most in the OECD.

The system's rigid and hierarchical structure has been criticized for stifling creativity and innovation; described as intensely and "brutally" competitive, the system is often blamed for the high suicide rate in the country, particularly the growing rates among those aged 10–19. Various media outlets attribute the country's high suicide rate to the nationwide anxiety around the country's college entrance exams, which determine the trajectory of students' entire lives and careers. Former South Korean hagwon teacher Se-Woong Koo wrote that the South Korean education system amounts to child abuse and that it should be "reformed and restructured without delay". The system has also been criticized for producing an excess supply of university graduates creating an overeducated and underemployed labor force; in the first quarter of 2013 alone, nearly 3.3 million South Korean university graduates were jobless, leaving many graduates overqualified for jobs requiring less education. Further criticism has been stemmed for causing labor shortages in various skilled blue collar labor and vocational occupations, where many go unfilled as the negative social stigma associated with vocational careers and not having a university degree continues to remain deep-rooted in South Korean society.

Language 

Korean is the official language of South Korea, and is classified by most linguists as a language isolate. It incorporates a significant number of loan words from Chinese. Korean uses an indigenous writing system called Hangul, created in 1446 by King Sejong, to provide a convenient alternative to the Classical Chinese Hanja characters that were difficult to learn and did not fit the Korean language well. South Korea still uses some Chinese Hanja characters in limited areas, such as print media and legal documentation.

The Korean language in South Korea has a standard dialect known as the Seoul dialect (after the capital city), with an additional four dialects (Chungcheong, Gangwon, Gyeongsang, and Jeolla) and one language (Jeju) in use around the country.

Almost all South Korean students today learn English throughout their education, with some optionally choosing Japanese or Mandarin as well.

Religion 

According to the results of the census of 2015, more than half of the South Korean population (56.1%) declared themselves not affiliated with any religious organizations. In a 2012 survey, 52% declared themselves "religious", 31% said they were "not religious" and 15% identified themselves as "convinced atheists". Of the people who are affiliated with a religious organization, most are Christians and Buddhists. According to the 2015 census, 27.6% of the population were Christians (19.7% identified themselves as Protestants, 7.9% as Roman Catholics) and 15.5% were Buddhists. Other religions include Islam (130,000 Muslims, mostly migrant workers from Pakistan and Bangladesh but including some 35,000 Korean Muslims), the homegrown sect of Won Buddhism, and a variety of indigenous religions, including Cheondoism (a Confucianizing religion), Jeungsanism, Daejongism, Daesun Jinrihoe, and others. Freedom of religion is guaranteed by the constitution, and there is no state religion. Overall, between the 2005 and 2015 censuses, there has been a slight decline of Christianity (down from 29% to 27.6%), a sharp decline of Buddhism (down from 22.8% to 15.5%), and a rise of the unaffiliated population (from 47.2% to 56.9%).

Christianity is South Korea's largest organized religion, accounting for more than half of all South Korean adherents of religious organizations. There are approximately 13.5 million Christians in South Korea today; about two thirds of them belonging to Protestant churches, and the rest to the Catholic Church. The number of Protestants has been stagnant throughout the 1990s and the 2000s, but increased to a peak level throughout the 2010s. Roman Catholics increased significantly between the 1980s and the 2000s, but declined throughout the 2010s. Christianity, unlike in other East Asian countries, found fertile ground in Korea in the 18th century, and by the end of the 18th century it persuaded a large part of the population, as the declining monarchy supported it and opened the country to widespread proselytism as part of a project of Westernization. The weakness of Korean Sindo, which – unlike Japanese Shinto and China's religious system – never developed into a national religion of high status, combined with the impoverished state of Korean Buddhism, (after 500 years of suppression at the hands of the Joseon state, by the 20th century it was virtually extinct) left a free hand to Christian churches. Christianity's similarity to native religious narratives has been studied as another factor that contributed to its success in the peninsula. The Japanese colonization of the first half of the 20th century further strengthened the identification of Christianity with Korean nationalism, as the Japanese coopted native Korean Sindo into the Nipponic Imperial Shinto that they tried to establish in the peninsula. Widespread Christianization of the Koreans took place during State Shinto, after its abolition, and then in the independent South Korea as the newly established military government supported Christianity and tried to utterly oust native Sindo.

Among Christian denominations, Presbyterianism is the largest. About nine million people belong to one of the hundred different Presbyterian churches; the biggest ones are the HapDong Presbyterian Church, TongHap Presbyterian Church and the Koshin Presbyterian Church. South Korea is also the second-largest missionary-sending nation, after the United States.

Buddhism was introduced to Korea in the 4th century. It soon became a dominant religion in the southeastern kingdom of Silla, the region that hitherto hosts the strongest concentration of Buddhists in South Korea. In the other states of the Three Kingdoms Period, Goguryeo and Baekje, it was made the state religion respectively in 372 and 528. It remained the state religion in Later Silla (North South States Period) and Goryeo. It was later suppressed throughout much of the subsequent history under the unified kingdom of Joseon (1392–1897), which officially adopted a strict Korean Confucianism. Today, South Korea has about 7 million Buddhists, most of them affiliated to the Jogye Order. Most of the National Treasures of South Korea are Buddhist artifacts.

Health 

South Korea has a universal healthcare system. According to one ranking, it has the world's second best healthcare system.

Suicide in South Korea is the 10th highest in the world according to the World Health Organization, as well as the highest suicide rate in the OECD.

South Korean hospitals have advanced medical equipment and facilities readily available, ranking 4th for MRI units per capita and 6th for CT scanners per capita in the OECD. It also had the OECD's second largest number of hospital beds per 1000 people at 9.56 beds.

Life expectancy has been rising rapidly and South Korea ranked 11th in the world for life expectancy at 82.3 years by the WHO in 2015. It also has the third highest health adjusted life expectancy in the world.

Foreign relations 

South Korea maintains diplomatic relations with more than 188 countries. The country has also been a member of the United Nations since 1991, when it became a member state at the same time as North Korea. On 1 January 2007, former South Korean Foreign Minister Ban Ki-moon served as UN Secretary-General from 2007 to 2016. It has also developed links with the Association of Southeast Asian Nations as both a member of ASEAN Plus three, a body of observers, and the East Asia Summit (EAS).

In November 2009, South Korea joined the OECD Development Assistance Committee, marking the first time a former aid recipient country joined the group as a donor member.

South Korea hosted the G-20 Summit in Seoul in November 2010, a year that saw South Korea and the European Union conclude a free trade agreement (FTA) to reduce trade barriers. South Korea went on to sign a Free Trade Agreement with Canada and Australia in 2014, and another with New Zealand in 2015.

North Korea 

Both North and South Korea claim complete sovereignty over the entire peninsula and outlying islands. Despite mutual animosity, reconciliation efforts have continued since the initial separation between North and South Korea. Political figures such as Kim Koo worked to reconcile the two governments even after the Korean War. With longstanding animosity following the Korean War from 1950 to 1953, North Korea and South Korea signed an agreement to pursue peace. On 4 October 2007, Roh Moo-Hyun and North Korean leader Kim Jong-il signed an eight-point agreement on issues of permanent peace, high-level talks, economic cooperation, renewal of train services, highway and air travel, and a joint Olympic cheering squad.

Despite the Sunshine Policy and efforts at reconciliation, the progress was complicated by North Korean missile tests in 1993, 1998, 2006, 2009, and 2013. By early 2009, relationships between North and South Korea were very tense; North Korea had been reported to have deployed missiles, ended its former agreements with South Korea, and threatened South Korea and the United States not to interfere with a satellite launch it had planned. North and South Korea are still technically at war (having never signed a peace treaty after the Korean War) and share the world's most heavily fortified border. On 27 May 2009, North Korean media declared that the Armistice is no longer valid because of the South Korean government's pledge to "definitely join" the Proliferation Security Initiative. To further complicate and intensify strains between the two nations, the sinking of the South Korean warship Cheonan in March 2010 was affirmed by the South Korean government to have been caused by a North Korean torpedo, which the North denies. President Lee Myung-bak declared in May 2010 that Seoul would cut all trade with North Korea as part of measures primarily aimed at striking back at North Korea diplomatically and financially, except for the joint Kaesong Industrial Project and humanitarian aid. North Korea initially threatened to sever all ties, to completely abrogate the previous pact of non-aggression, and to expel all South Koreans from a joint industrial zone in Kaesong, but backtracked on its threats and decided to continue its ties with South Korea. Despite the continuing ties, the Kaesong Industrial Region has seen a large decrease in investment and manpower as a result of this military conflict. In February 2016, the Kaesong complex was closed by Seoul in reaction to North Korea's launch of a rocket earlier in the month, which was unanimously condemned by the United Nations Security Council.
The 2017 election of President Moon Jae-in has seen a change in approach towards the North, and both sides used the South Korean-held 2018 Winter Olympics as an opportunity for engagement, with a very senior North Korean political delegation sent to the games, along with a reciprocal visit by senior South Korean cabinet members to the North soon afterwards.

China and Russia 

Historically, Korea had close relations with the dynasties in China, and some Korean kingdoms were members of the Imperial Chinese tributary system. The Korean kingdoms also ruled over some Chinese kingdoms including the Khitan people and the Manchurians before the Qing dynasty and received tributes from them. In modern times, before the formation of South Korea, Korean independence fighters worked with Chinese soldiers during the Japanese occupation. However, after World War II, the People's Republic of China embraced Maoism while South Korea sought close relations with the United States. The PRC assisted North Korea with manpower and supplies during the Korean War, and in its aftermath the diplomatic relationship between South Korea and the PRC almost completely ceased. Relations thawed gradually and South Korea and the PRC re-established formal diplomatic relations on 24 August 1992. The two countries sought to improve bilateral relations and lifted the forty-year-old trade embargo, and South Korean–Chinese relations have improved steadily since 1992. The Republic of Korea broke off official relations with the Republic of China (Taiwan) upon gaining official relations with the People's Republic of China, which does not recognize Taiwan's sovereignty.

China has become South Korea's largest trading partner by far, sending 26% of South Korean exports in 2016 worth $124 billion, as well as an additional $32 billion worth of exports to Hong Kong. South Korea is also China's fourth largest trading partner, with $93 billion of Chinese imports in 2016.

The 2017 deployment of THAAD defense missiles by the United States military in South Korea in response to North Korean missile tests has been protested strongly by the Chinese government, concerned that the technologically advanced missile defense could be used more broadly against China. Relations between the governments have cooled in response, with South Korean commercial and cultural interests in China having been targeted, and Chinese tourism to South Korea having been curtailed. The situation was largely resolved by South Korea making significant military concessions to China in exchange for THAAD, including not deploying any more anti-ballistic missile systems in South Korea and not participating in an alliance between the United States and Japan.

South Korea and Russia are participants in the Six-party talks on the North Korea's nuclear proliferation issue. Moon Jae-in's administration has focused on increasing South Korea's consumption of natural gas. These plans include re-opening dialogue around a natural gas pipeline that would come from Russia and pass through North Korea. In June 2018, president Moon Jae-in became the first South Korean leader to speak in the Russian Parliament. On 22 June, Moon Jae-in and Putin signed a document for foundation of free trade area.

Japan 

Korea and Japan have had difficult relations since ancient times, but also significant cultural exchange, with Korea acting as the gateway between East Asia and Japan. Contemporary perceptions of Japan are still largely defined by Japan's 35 year colonization of Korea in the 20th century, which is generally regarded in South Korea as having been very negative. Japan is today South Korea's third largest trading partner, with 12% ($46 billion) of exports in 2016.

There were no formal diplomatic ties between South Korea and Japan directly after independence the end of World War II in 1945. South Korea and Japan eventually signed the Treaty on Basic Relations between Japan and the Republic of Korea in 1965 to establish diplomatic ties. There is heavy anti-Japanese sentiment in South Korea because of a number of unsettled Japanese-Korean disputes, many of which stem from the period of Japanese occupation after the Japanese annexation of Korea. During World War II, more than 100,000 Koreans served in the Imperial Japanese Army. Korean women were coerced and forced to serve the Imperial Japanese Army as sexual slaves, called comfort women, in both Korea and throughout the Japanese war fronts.

Longstanding issues such as Japanese war crimes against Korean civilians, the negationist re-writing of Japanese textbooks relating Japanese atrocities during World War II, the territorial disputes over the Liancourt Rocks, known in South Korea as "Dokdo" and in Japan as "Takeshima", and visits by Japanese politicians to the Yasukuni Shrine, honoring Japanese people (civilians and military) killed during the war continue to trouble Korean-Japanese relations. The Liancourt Rocks were the first Korean territories to be forcibly colonized by Japan in 1905. Although it was again returned to Korea along with the rest of its territory in 1951 with the signing of the Treaty of San Francisco, Japan does not recant on its claims that the Liancourt Rocks are Japanese territory.
In response to then-Prime Minister Junichiro Koizumi's visits to the Yasukuni Shrine, former President Roh Moo-hyun suspended all summit talks between South Korea and Japan in 2009.
A summit between the nations' leaders was eventually held on 9 February 2018 during the Korean held Winter Olympics. South Korea asked the International Olympic Committee (IOC) to ban the Japanese Rising Sun Flag from the 2020 Summer Olympics in Tokyo, and the IOC said in a statement "sports stadiums should be free of any political demonstration. When concerns arise at games time we look at them on a case-by-case basis."

European Union 

The European Union (EU) and South Korea are important trading partners, having negotiated a free trade agreement for many years since South Korea was designated as a priority FTA partner in 2006. The free trade agreement was approved in September 2010, and took effect on 1 July 2011. South Korea is the EU's tenth largest trade partner, and the EU has become South Korea's fourth largest export destination. EU trade with South Korea exceeded €90 billion in 2015 and has enjoyed an annual average growth rate of 9.8% between 2003 and 2013.

The EU has been the single largest foreign investor in South Korea since 1962, and accounted for almost 45% of all FDI inflows into Korea in 2006. Nevertheless, EU companies have significant problems accessing and operating in the South Korean market because of stringent standards and testing requirements for products and services often creating barriers to trade. Both in its regular bilateral contacts with South Korea and through its FTA with Korea, the EU is seeking to improve this situation.

United States 

The close relationship began directly after World War II, when the United States temporarily administrated Korea for three years (mainly in the South, with the Soviet Union engaged in North Korea) after Japan. Upon the onset of the Korean War in 1950, U.S. forces were sent to defend against an invasion from North Korea of the South, and subsequently fought as the largest contributor of UN troops. The United States participation was critical for preventing the near defeat of the Republic of Korea by northern forces, as well as fighting back for the territory gains that define the South Korean nation today.

Following the Armistice, South Korea and the U.S. agreed to a "Mutual Defense Treaty", under which an attack on either party in the Pacific area would summon a response from both. In 1967, South Korea obliged the mutual defense treaty, by sending a large combat troop contingent to support the United States in the Vietnam War. The US has over 23,000 troops stationed in South Korea, including the U.S. Eighth Army, Seventh Air Force, and U.S. Naval Forces Korea. The two nations have strong economic, diplomatic, and military ties, although they have at times disagreed with regard to policies towards North Korea, and with regard to some of South Korea's industrial activities that involve usage of rocket or nuclear technology. There had also been strong anti-American sentiment during certain periods, which has largely moderated in the modern day.

The two nations also share a close economic relationship, with the U.S. being South Korea's second largest trading partner, receiving $66 billion in exports in 2016. In 2007, a free trade agreement known as the Republic of Korea-United States Free Trade Agreement (KORUS FTA) was signed between South Korea and the United States, but its formal implementation was repeatedly delayed, pending approval by the legislative bodies of the two countries. On 12 October 2011, the U.S. Congress passed the long-stalled trade agreement with South Korea. It went into effect on 15 March 2012.

Military 

Unresolved tension with North Korea has prompted South Korea to allocate 2.6% of its GDP and 15% of all government spending to its military (Government share of GDP: 14.967%), while maintaining compulsory conscription for men. Consequently, South Korea has the world's seventh largest number of active troops (599,000 in 2018), the world's highest number of reserve troops (3,100,000 in 2018).

The South Korean military consists of the Army (ROKA), the Navy (ROKN), the Air Force (ROKAF), and the Marine Corps (ROKMC), and reserve forces. Many of these forces are concentrated near the Korean Demilitarized Zone. All South Korean males are constitutionally required to serve in the military, typically 18 months. Previous exceptions for South Korean citizens of mixed race no longer apply since 2011.

In addition to male conscription in South Korea's sovereign military, 1,800 Korean males are selected every year to serve 18 months in the KATUSA Program to further augment the United States Forces Korea (USFK). In 2010, South Korea was spending ₩1.68 trillion in a cost-sharing agreement with the US to provide budgetary support to the US forces in Korea, on top of the ₩29.6 trillion budget for its own military.

The South Korean Army has 2,500 tanks in operation, including the K1A1 and K2 Black Panther, which form the backbone of the South Korean army's mechanized armor and infantry forces. A sizable arsenal of many artillery systems, including 1,700 self-propelled K55 and K9 Thunder howitzers and 680 helicopters and UAVs of numerous types, are assembled to provide additional fire, reconnaissance, and logistics support. South Korea's smaller but more advanced artillery force and wide range of airborne reconnaissance platforms are pivotal in the counter-battery suppression of North Korea's large artillery force, which operates more than 13,000 artillery systems deployed in various state of fortification and mobility.

The South Korean Navy has made its first major transformation into a blue-water navy through the formation of the Strategic Mobile Fleet, which includes a battle group of Chungmugong Yi Sun-sin class destroyers, Dokdo class amphibious assault ship, AIP-driven Type 214 submarines, and King Sejong the Great class destroyers, which is equipped with the latest baseline of Aegis fleet-defense system that allows the ships to track and destroy multiple cruise missiles and ballistic missiles simultaneously, forming an integral part of South Korea's indigenous missile defense umbrella against the North Korean military's missile threat.

The South Korean Air Force operates 840 aircraft, making it world's ninth largest air force, including several types of advanced fighters like F-15K, heavily modified KF-16C/D, and the indigenous T-50 Golden Eagle, supported by well-maintained fleets of older fighters such as F-4E and KF-5E/F that still effectively serve the air force alongside the more modern aircraft. In an attempt to gain strength in terms of not just numbers but also modernity, the commissioning of four Boeing 737 AEW&C aircraft, under Project Peace Eye for centralized intelligence gathering and analysis on a modern battlefield, will enhance the fighters' and other support aircraft's ability to perform their missions with awareness and precision.

In May 2011, Korea Aerospace Industries Ltd., South Korea's largest plane maker, signed a $400 million deal to sell 16 T-50 Golden Eagle trainer jets to Indonesia, making South Korea the first country in East Asia to export supersonic jets.

From time to time, South Korea has sent its troops overseas to assist American forces. It has participated in most major conflicts that the United States has been involved in the past 50 years. South Korea dispatched 325,517 troops to fight alongside American, Australian, Filipino, New Zealand and South Vietnamese soldiers in the Vietnam War, with a peak strength of 50,000. In 2004, South Korea sent 3,300 troops of the Zaytun Division to help re-building in northern Iraq, and was the third largest contributor in the coalition forces after only the US and Britain. Beginning in 2001, South Korea had so far deployed 24,000 troops in the Middle East region to support the War on Terrorism. A further 1,800 were deployed since 2007 to reinforce UN peacekeeping forces in Lebanon.

United States contingent 
The United States has stationed a substantial contingent of troops to defend South Korea. There are approximately 28,500 U.S. military personnel stationed in South Korea, most of them serving one year unaccompanied tours. The U.S. troops, which are primarily ground and air units, are assigned to USFK and mainly assigned to the Eighth United States Army of the U.S. Army and Seventh Air Force of the U.S. Air Force. They are stationed in installations at Osan, Kunsan, Yongsan, Dongducheon, Sungbuk, Camp Humphreys, and Daegu, as well as at Camp Bonifas in the DMZ Joint Security Area.

A fully functioning UN Command is at the top of the chain of command of all forces in South Korea, including the U.S. forces and the entire South Korean military – if a sudden escalation of war between North and South Korea were to occur the United States would assume control of the South Korean armed forces in all military and paramilitary moves. There has been long-term agreement between the United States and South Korea that South Korea should eventually assume the lead for its own defense. This transition to a South Korean command has been slow and often postponed, although it is currently scheduled to occur in the early 2020s.

Conscientious objection 

Male citizens who refuse or reject to undertake military services because of conscientious objection are typically imprisoned, with over 600 individuals usually imprisoned at any given time; more than the rest of the world put together. The vast majority of these are young men from the Jehovah's Witnesses Christian denomination. However, in a court ruling of 2018, conscientious objectors were permitted to reject military service.

Economy 

South Korea's mixed economy ranks 10th nominal and 13th purchasing power parity GDP in the world, identifying it as one of the G-20 major economies. It is a developed country with a high-income economy and is the most industrialized member country of the OECD. South Korean brands such as LG Electronics and Samsung are internationally famous and garnered South Korea's reputation for its quality electronics and other manufactured goods.

Its massive investment in education has taken the country from mass illiteracy to a major international technological powerhouse. The country's national economy benefits from a highly skilled workforce and is among the most educated countries in the world with one of the highest percentages of its citizens holding a tertiary education degree. South Korea's economy was one of the world's fastest-growing from the early 1960s to the late 1990s, and was still one of the fastest-growing developed countries in the 2000s, along with Hong Kong, Singapore and Taiwan, the other three Asian Tigers. It recorded the fastest rise in average GDP per capita in the world between 1980 and 1990. South Koreans refer to this growth as the Miracle on the Han River. The South Korean economy is heavily dependent on international trade, and in 2014, South Korea was the fifth-largest exporter and seventh-largest importer in the world.

Despite the South Korean economy's high growth potential and apparent structural stability, the country suffers damage to its credit rating in the stock market because of the belligerence of North Korea in times of deep military crises, which has an adverse effect on South Korean financial markets. The International Monetary Fund compliments the resilience of the South Korean economy against various economic crises, citing low state debt and high fiscal reserves that can quickly be mobilized to address financial emergencies. Although it was severely harmed by the 1997 Asian financial crisis, the South Korean economy managed a rapid recovery and subsequently tripled its GDP.

Furthermore, South Korea was one of the few developed countries that were able to avoid a recession during the global financial crisis. Its economic growth rate reached 6.2 percent in 2010 (the fastest growth for eight years after significant growth by 7.2 percent in 2002), a sharp recovery from economic growth rates of 2.3% in 2008 and 0.2% in 2009 during the Great Recession. The unemployment rate in South Korea also remained low in 2009, at 3.6%.

South Korea became a member of the Organisation for Economic Co-operation and Development (OECD) in 1996.

The following list includes the largest South Korean companies by revenue in 2017 who are all listed as part of the Fortune Global 500:

Transportation, energy and infrastructure 

South Korea has a technologically advanced transport network consisting of high-speed railways, highways, bus routes, ferry services, and air routes that crisscross the country. Korea Expressway Corporation operates the toll highways and service amenities en route.

Korail provides frequent train services to all major South Korean cities. Two rail lines, Gyeongui and Donghae Bukbu Line, to North Korea are now being reconnected. The Korean high-speed rail system, KTX, provides high-speed service along Gyeongbu and Honam Line. Major cities including Seoul, Busan, Incheon, Daegu, Daejeon and Gwangju have urban rapid transit systems. Express bus terminals are available in most cities.

South Korea's main gateway and largest airport is Incheon International Airport, serving  passengers in 2016. Other international airports include Gimpo, Busan and Jeju. There are also many airports that were built as part of the infrastructure boom but are barely used. There are also many heliports.

The national carrier, Korean Air served over 26,800,000 passengers, including almost 19,000,000 international passengers in 2016. A second carrier, Asiana Airlines also serves domestic and international traffic. Combined, South Korean airlines serve 297 international routes. Smaller airlines, such as Jeju Air, provide domestic service with lower fares.

South Korea is the world's fifth-largest nuclear power producer and the second-largest in Asia . Nuclear power in South Korea supplies 45% of electricity production, and research is very active with investigation into a variety of advanced reactors, including a small modular reactor, a liquid-metal fast/transmutation reactor and a high-temperature hydrogen generation design. Fuel production and waste handling technologies have also been developed locally. It is also a member of the ITER project.

South Korea is an emerging exporter of nuclear reactors, having concluded agreements with the UAE to build and maintain four advanced nuclear reactors, with Jordan for a research nuclear reactor, and with Argentina for construction and repair of heavy-water nuclear reactors. , South Korea and Turkey are in negotiations regarding construction of two nuclear reactors. South Korea is also preparing to bid on construction of a light-water nuclear reactor for Argentina.

South Korea is not allowed to enrich uranium or develop traditional uranium enrichment technology on its own, because of US political pressure, unlike most major nuclear powers such as Japan, Germany, and France, competitors of South Korea in the international nuclear market. This impediment to South Korea's indigenous nuclear industrial undertaking has sparked occasional diplomatic rows between the two allies. While South Korea is successful in exporting its electricity-generating nuclear technology and nuclear reactors, it cannot capitalize on the market for nuclear enrichment facilities and refineries, preventing it from further expanding its export niche. South Korea has sought unique technologies such as pyroprocessing to circumvent these obstacles and seek a more advantageous competition. The US has recently been wary of South Korea's burgeoning nuclear program, which South Korea insists will be for civilian use only.

South Korea is the third highest ranked Continental Asian country in the World Economic Forum's Network Readiness Index (NRI) after Singapore and Hong Kong respectively – an indicator for determining the development level of a country's information and communication technologies. South Korea ranked number 10 overall in the 2014 NRI ranking, up from 11 in 2013.

Tourism 

In 2016, 17 million foreign tourists visited South Korea. With rising tourist prospects, especially from foreign countries outside of East Asia, the South Korean government has set a target of attracting 20 million foreign tourists a year by 2017.

South Korean tourism is driven by many factors, including the prominence of Korean pop culture such as South Korean pop music and television dramas, known as the Korean Wave or Hallyu, has gained popularity throughout East Asia. The Hyundai Research Institute reported that the Korean Wave has a direct impact in encouraging direct foreign investment back into the country through demand for products, and the tourism industry. Among East Asian countries, China was the most receptive, investing $1.4 billion in South Korea, with much of the investment within its service sector, a sevenfold increase from 2001. According to an analysis by economist Han Sang-Wan, a 1 percent increase in the exports of Korean cultural content pushes consumer goods exports up 0.083 percent while a 1 percent increase in Korean pop content exports to a country produces a 0.019 percent bump in tourism.

South Korean National Pension System 

The South Korean pension system was created to provide benefits to persons reaching old age, families and persons stricken with death of their primary breadwinner, and for the purposes of stabilizing its nation's welfare state. South Korea's pension system structure is primarily based on taxation and is income-related. In 2007 there was a total of 18,367,000 insured individuals with only around 511,000 persons excluded from mandatory contribution. The current pension system is divided into four categories distributing benefits to participants through national, military personnel, governmental, and private school teacher pension schemes. The national pension scheme is the primary welfare system providing allowances to the majority of persons. Eligibility for the national pension scheme is not dependent on income but on age and residence, where those between the ages of 18 to 59 are covered. Any one who is under the age of 18 are dependents of someone who is covered or under a special exclusion where they are allowed to alternative provisions. The national pension scheme is divided into four categories of insured persons – the workplace-based insured, the individually insured, the voluntarily insured, and the voluntarily and continuously insured.

Employees between the ages of 18 to 59 are covered under the workplace-based pension scheme and contribute 4.5% of their gross monthly earnings. The national pension covers employees who work in firms that employ five or more employees, fishermen, farmers, and the self-employed in both rural and urban areas. Employers are also covered under the workplace-based pension scheme and help cover their employees obligated 9% contribution by providing the remaining 4.5%. Anyone who is not employed, of the age of 60 or above, or excluded by article 6 of the National Pension Act, but is of the ages between 18 and 59, is covered under the individually insured pension scheme. Persons covered by the individually insured pension scheme are in charge of paying the entire 9% contribution themselves. Voluntarily insured persons are not subjected to mandatory coverage but can choose to be. This category comprises retirees who voluntarily choose to have additional benefits, individuals under the age of 27 without income, and individuals whose spouses are covered under a public welfare system, whether military, governmental, or private school teacher pensions. Like the individually insured persons, they too are in charge of covering the full amount of the contribution. Voluntarily and continuously insured persons consists of individuals 60 years of age who want to fulfill the minimum insured period of 20 years to qualify for old age pension benefits. Excluding the workplace-based insured persons, all the other insured persons personally cover their own 9% contribution.

South Korea's old-age pension scheme covers individuals age 60 or older for the rest of their life as long as they have satisfied the minimum of 20 years of national pension coverage beforehand. Individuals with a minimum of 10 years covered under the national pension scheme and who are 60 years of age are able to be covered under a 'reduced old-age pension' scheme. There also is an 'active old-age pension' scheme that covers individuals age 60 to 65 engaged in activities yielding earned income. Individuals age of 55 and younger than 60 who are not engaged in activities yielding earned income are eligible to be covered under the 'early old-age pension' scheme. Around 60% of all Korean elders, age 65 and over are entitled to a 5% benefit of their past average income at an average of 90,000 Korean Won (KRW). Basic old-age pension schemes covered individuals 65 years of age who earned below an amount set by presidential order. In 2010, that ceiling was 700,000 KRW for a single individual and 1,120,000 for a couple, equivalent to around $600.00 and $960.00.

Science and technology 

Scientific and technological development in South Korea at first did not occur largely because of more pressing matters such as the division of Korea and the Korean War that occurred right after its independence. It was not until the 1960s under the dictatorship of Park Chung-hee where South Korea's economy rapidly grew from industrialization and the Chaebol corporations such as Samsung and LG. Ever since the industrialization of South Korea's economy, South Korea has placed its focus on technology-based corporations, which has been supported by infrastructure developments by the government. South Korean corporations Samsung and LG were ranked first and third largest mobile phone companies in the world in the first quarter of 2012, respectively. An estimated 90% of South Koreans own a mobile phone. Aside from placing/receiving calls and text messaging, mobile phones in the country are widely used for watching Digital Multimedia Broadcasting (DMB) or viewing websites. Over one million DMB phones have been sold and the three major wireless communications providers SK Telecom, KT, and LG U+ provide coverage in all major cities and other areas. South Korea has the fastest Internet download speeds in the world, with an average download speed of 25.3 Mbit/s.

South Korea leads the OECD in graduates in science and engineering. From 2014 to 2019, the country ranked first among the most innovative countries in the Bloomberg Innovation Index. It was ranked 5th in the Global Innovation Index 2022, up from 10th in 2020 and 11st in 2019. Additionally, South Korea today is known as a Launchpad of a mature mobile market, where developers can reap benefits of a market where very few technology constraints exist. There is a growing trend of inventions of new types of media or apps, utilizing the 4G and 5G internet infrastructure in South Korea. South Korea has today the infrastructures to meet a density of population and culture that has the capability to create strong local particularity.

Cyber security 

Following cyberattacks in the first half of 2013, whereby government, news-media, television station, and bank websites were compromised, the national government committed to the training of 5,000 new cybersecurity experts by 2017. The South Korean government blamed North Korea for these attacks, as well as incidents that occurred in 2009, 2011 and 2012, but Pyongyang denies the accusations.

In late September 2013, a computer-security competition jointly sponsored by the defense ministry and the National Intelligence Service was announced. The winners were announced on 29 September 2013 and shared a total prize pool of 80 million won (US$74,000).

South Korea's government maintains a broad-ranging approach toward the regulation of specific online content and imposes a substantial level of censorship on election-related discourse and on many websites that the government deems subversive or socially harmful.

Aerospace engineering 

South Korea has sent up 10 satellites since 1992, all using foreign rockets and overseas launch pads, notably Arirang-1 in 1999, and Arirang-2 in 2006 as part of its space partnership with Russia. Arirang-1 was lost in space in 2008, after nine years in service.

In April 2008, Yi So-yeon became the first Korean to fly in space, aboard the Russian Soyuz TMA-12.

In June 2009, the first spaceport of South Korea, Naro Space Center, was completed at Goheung, Jeollanam-do. The launch of Naro-1 in August 2009 resulted in a failure. The second attempt in June 2010 was also unsuccessful. However, the third launch of the Naro 1 in January 2013 was successful. The government plans to develop Naro-2 by 2018.

South Korea's efforts to build an indigenous space launch vehicle have been marred due to persistent political pressure from the United States, who had for many decades hindered South Korea's indigenous rocket and missile development programs in fear of their possible connection to clandestine military ballistic missile programs, which Korea many times insisted did not violate the research and development guidelines stipulated by US-Korea agreements on restriction of South Korean rocket technology research and development. South Korea has sought the assistance of foreign countries such as Russia through MTCR commitments to supplement its restricted domestic rocket technology. The two failed KSLV-I launch vehicles were based on the Universal Rocket Module, the first stage of the Russian Angara rocket, combined with a solid-fueled second stage built by South Korea.

Robotics 

Robotics has been included in the list of main national R&D projects in Korea since 2003. In 2009, the government announced plans to build robot-themed parks in Incheon and Masan with a mix of public and private funding.

In 2005, Korea Advanced Institute of Science and Technology (KAIST) developed the world's second walking humanoid robot, HUBO. A team in the Korea Institute of Industrial Technology developed the first Korean android, EveR-1 in May 2006.
EveR-1 has been succeeded by more complex models with improved movement and vision.

Plans of creating English-teaching robot assistants to compensate for the shortage of teachers were announced in February 2010, with the robots being deployed to most preschools and kindergartens by 2013. Robotics are also incorporated in the entertainment sector as well; the Korean Robot Game Festival has been held every year since 2004 to promote science and robot technology.

Biotechnology 
The medical sector accounts for a large part of the production, including production of hepatitis vaccines and antibiotics.

Recently, research and development in genetics and cloning has received increasing attention, with the first successful cloning of a dog, Snuppy (in 2005), and the cloning of two females of an endangered species of gray wolves by the Seoul National University in 2007.

The rapid growth of the industry has resulted in significant voids in regulation of ethics, as was highlighted by the scientific misconduct case involving Hwang Woo-Suk.

Since late 2020, SK Bioscience Inc. (a division of SK Group) has been producing a major proportion of the Vaxzevria vaccine (also known as COVID-19 Vaccine AstraZeneca), under license from the University of Oxford and AstraZeneca, for worldwide distribution through the COVAX facility under the WHO hospice. A recent agreement with Novavax expands its production for a second vaccine to 40 million doses in 2022, with a $450 million investment in domestic and overseas facilities.

Culture and society 

South Korea shares its traditional culture with North Korea, but the two Koreas have developed distinct contemporary forms of culture since the peninsula was divided in 1945. Historically, while the culture of Korea has been heavily influenced by that of neighboring China, it has nevertheless managed to develop a unique cultural identity that is distinct from its larger neighbor. Its rich and vibrant culture left 21 UNESCO Intangible Cultural Heritages of Humanity, the fourth largest in the world, along with 15 World Heritage Sites. The South Korean Ministry of Culture, Sports and Tourism actively encourages the traditional arts, as well as modern forms, through funding and education programs.

The industrialization and urbanization of South Korea have brought many changes to the way modern Koreans live. Changing economics and lifestyles have led to a concentration of population in major cities, especially the capital Seoul, with multi-generational households separating into nuclear family living arrangements. A 2014 Euromonitor study found that South Koreans drink the most alcohol on a weekly basis compared to the rest of the world. South Koreans drink 13.7 shots of liquor per week on average and, of the 44 other countries analyzed, Russia, the Philippines, and Thailand follow.

Art 

Korean art has been highly influenced by Buddhism and Confucianism, which can be seen in the many traditional paintings, sculptures, ceramics and the performing arts. Korean pottery and porcelain, such as Joseon's baekja and buncheong, and Goryeo's celadon are well known throughout the world. The Korean tea ceremony, pansori, talchum and buchaechum are also notable Korean performing arts.

Post-war modern Korean art started to flourish in the 1960s and 1970s, when South Korean artists took interest in geometrical shapes and intangible subjects. Establishing a harmony between man and nature was also a favorite of this time. Because of social instability, social issues appeared as main subjects in the 1980s. Art was influenced by various international events and exhibits in Korea, and with it brought more diversity. The Olympic Sculpture Garden in 1988, the transposition of the 1993 edition of the Whitney Biennial to Seoul, the creation of the Gwangju Biennale and the Korean Pavilion at the Venice Biennale in 1995 were notable events.

Architecture 

Because of South Korea's tumultuous history, construction and destruction has been repeated endlessly, resulting in an interesting melange of architectural styles and designs.

Korean traditional architecture is characterized by its harmony with nature. Ancient architects adopted the bracket system characterized by thatched roofs and heated floors called ondol. People of the upper classes built bigger houses with elegantly curved tiled roofs with lifting eaves. Traditional architecture can be seen in the palaces and temples, preserved old houses called hanok, and special sites like Hahoe Folk Village, Yangdong Village of Gyeongju and Korean Folk Village. Traditional architecture may also be seen at the nine UNESCO World Heritage Sites in South Korea.

Western architecture was first introduced to Korea at the end of the 19th century. Churches, offices for foreign legislation, schools and university buildings were built in new styles. With the annexation of Korea by Japan in 1910 the colonial regime intervened in Korea's architectural heritage, and Japanese-style modern architecture was imposed. The anti-Japanese sentiment, and the Korean War, led to the destruction of most buildings constructed during that time.

Korean architecture entered a new phase of development during the post-Korean War reconstruction, incorporating modern architectural trends and styles. Stimulated by the economic growth in the 1970s and 1980s, active redevelopment saw new horizons in architectural design. In the aftermath of the 1988 Seoul Olympics, South Korea has witnessed a wide variation of styles in its architectural landscape due, in large part, to the opening up of the market to foreign architects. Contemporary architectural efforts have been constantly trying to balance the traditional philosophy of "harmony with nature" and the fast-paced urbanization that the country has been going through in recent years.

Cuisine 

Korean cuisine, hanguk yori (한국요리; 韓國料理), or hansik (한식; 韓食), has evolved through centuries of social and political change. Ingredients and dishes vary by province. There are many significant regional dishes that have proliferated in different variations across the country in the present day. The Korean royal court cuisine once brought all of the unique regional specialties together for the royal family. Meals consumed both by the royal family and ordinary Korean citizens have been regulated by a unique culture of etiquette.

Korean cuisine is largely based on rice, noodles, tofu, vegetables, fish and meats. Traditional Korean meals are noted for the number of side dishes, banchan (반찬), which accompany steam-cooked short-grain rice. Every meal is accompanied by numerous banchan. Kimchi (김치), a fermented, usually spicy vegetable dish is commonly served at every meal and is one of the best known Korean dishes. Korean cuisine usually involves heavy seasoning with sesame oil, doenjang (된장), a type of fermented soybean paste, soy sauce, salt, garlic, ginger, and gochujang (고추장), a hot pepper paste. Other well-known dishes are Bulgogi (불고기), grilled marinated beef; Gimbap (김밥); and Tteokbokki (떡볶이), a spicy snack consisting of rice cake seasoned with gochujang or a spicy chili paste.

Soups are also a common part of a Korean meal and are served as part of the main course rather than at the beginning or the end of the meal. Soups known as guk (국) are often made with meats, shellfish and vegetables. Similar to guk, tang (탕; 湯) has less water, and is more often served in restaurants. Another type is jjigae (찌개), a stew that is typically heavily seasoned with chili pepper and served boiling hot.

Popular Korean alcoholic beverages include Soju, Makgeolli and Bokbunja ju.

Korea is unique among East Asian countries in its use of metal chopsticks. Metal chopsticks have been discovered in Goguryeo archaeological sites.

Entertainment 

In addition to domestic consumption, South Korea has a thriving entertainment industry where various facets of South Korean entertainment, including television dramas, films, and popular music, has garnered international popularity and generated significant export revenues for the nation's economy. The cultural phenomenon known as Hallyu or the "Korean Wave", has swept many countries across Continental and East Asia making South Korea a major soft power as an exporter of popular culture and entertainment, rivaling Western nations such as the United States and the United Kingdom.

Until the 1990s, trot and traditional Korean folk based ballads dominated South Korean popular music. The emergence of the South Korean pop group Seo Taiji and Boys in 1992 marked a turning point for South Korean popular music, also known as K-pop. Since the 1990s, the genre has continuously re-modernized itself from incorporating elements of popular musical genres and trends from across the world such as Western popular music, experimental, jazz, gospel, Latin, classical, hip hop, rhythm and blues, electronic dance, reggae, country, folk, and rock on top of its uniquely traditional Korean music roots. Though Western-style pop, hip hop, rhythm and blues, rock, folk, electronic dance oriented acts have become dominant in the contemporary South Korean popular music scene, trot is still continues to be appreciated and enjoyed by South Koreans from older generations. K-pop idols, stars, and groups are well known across Continental Asia and have found international fame in the Western World by making millions of dollars in export revenue by harnessing and tapping into new uncharted music markets beyond East Asia. Many K-pop acts have also been able to secure a strong global following using online social media platforms such as the video sharing website YouTube. K-pop first began to establish and makes it mark on the outside world beyond the confines of Continental and East Asia following the unexpected success of South Korean singer Psy, when he became an instant international musical sensation as his song "Gangnam Style" topped global music charts in 2012. 

Since the success of the film Shiri in 1999, the Korean film industry has begun to gain recognition internationally. Domestic film has a dominant share of the market, partly because of the existence of screen quotas requiring cinemas to show Korean films at least 73 days a year. 2019's Parasite, directed by Bong Joon-ho, became the highest-grossing film in South Korea as well as the first non-English language film to win Best Picture at the United States-based Academy Awards that year amongst numerous other accolades.

South Korean television shows have become popular outside of Korea. South Korean television dramas, known as K-dramas, have begun to find fame internationally. Many dramas tend to have a romantic focus, such as Princess Hours, You're Beautiful, Playful Kiss, My Name is Kim Sam Soon, Boys Over Flowers, Winter Sonata, Autumn in My Heart, Full House, City Hunter, All About Eve, Secret Garden, I Can Hear Your Voice, Master's Sun, My Love from the Star, Healer, Descendants of the Sun, Guardian: The Lonely and Great God and Reply (TV series) . Historical dramas have included Faith, Dae Jang Geum, The Legend, Dong Yi, Moon Embracing the Sun, Sungkyunkwan Scandal, Iljimae and Kingdom. The 2021 survival drama Squid Game, created by Hwang Dong-hyuk, received critical acclaim and widespread international attention upon its release, becoming Netflix's most-watched series at launch and garnering a viewership of more than 142 million households during its first four weeks from launch.

Holidays 

There are many official public holidays in South Korea. Korean New Year's Day, or "Seollal", is celebrated on the first day of the Korean lunar calendar. Korean Independence Day falls on 1 March, and commemorates the 1 March Movement of 1919. Memorial Day is celebrated on 6 June, and its purpose is to honor the men and women who died in South Korea's independence movement. Constitution Day is on 17 July, and it celebrates the promulgation of Constitution of the Republic of Korea. Liberation Day, on 15 August, celebrates Korea's liberation from the Empire of Japan in 1945. Every 15th day of the 8th lunar month, Koreans celebrate the Midautumn Festival, in which Koreans visit their ancestral hometowns and eat a variety of traditional Korean foods. On 1 October, Armed Forces day is celebrated, honoring the military forces of South Korea. 3 October is National Foundation Day. Hangul Day, on 9 October commemorates the invention of hangul, the native alphabet of the Korean language.

Sports 

The martial art taekwondo originated in Korea. In the 1950s and 1960s, modern rules were standardized, with taekwondo becoming an official Olympic sport in 2000. Other Korean martial arts include Taekkyon, hapkido, Tang Soo Do, Kuk Sool Won, kumdo and subak.

Football has traditionally been regarded as the most popular sport in Korea, with Baseball as the second. Recent polling indicates that a majority, 41% of South Korean sports fans continue to self-identify as football fans, with baseball ranked 2nd at 25% of respondents. However, the polling did not indicate the extent to which respondents follow both sports. The national football team became the first team in the Asian Football Confederation to reach the FIFA World Cup semi-finals in the 2002 FIFA World Cup, jointly hosted by South Korea and Japan. The Korea Republic national team (as it is known) has qualified for every World Cup since Mexico 1986, and has broken out of the group stage twice: first in 2002, and again in 2010, when it was defeated by eventual semi-finalist Uruguay in the Round of 16. At the 2012 Summer Olympics, South Korea won the bronze medal for football.

Baseball was first introduced to Korea in 1905 and has since become one of the most popular sports in the country. Recent years have been characterized by increasing attendance and ticket prices for professional baseball games. The Korea Professional Baseball league, a 10-team circuit, was established in 1982. The South Korea national team finished third in the 2006 World Baseball Classic and second in the 2009 tournament. The team's 2009 final game against Japan was widely watched in Korea, with a large screen at Gwanghwamun crossing in Seoul broadcasting the game live. In the 2008 Summer Olympics, South Korea won the gold medal in baseball. Also in 1982, at the Baseball Worldcup, Korea won the gold medal. At the 2010 Asian Games, the Korean National Baseball team won the gold medal. Several Korean players have gone on to play in Major League Baseball.

Basketball is a popular sport in the country as well. South Korea has traditionally had one of the top basketball teams in Asia and one of the continent's strongest basketball divisions. Seoul hosted the 1967 and 1995 Asian Basketball Championship. The Korea national basketball team has won a record number of 23 medals at the event to date.

South Korea hosted the Asian Games in 1986 (Seoul), 2002 (Busan), and 2014 (Incheon). It also hosted the Winter Universiade in 1997, the Asian Winter Games in 1999, and the Summer Universiade in 2003 and 2015. In 1988, South Korea hosted the Summer Olympics in Seoul, coming fourth with 12 gold medals, 10 silver medals, and 11 bronze medals. South Korea regularly performs well in archery, shooting, table tennis, badminton, short track speed skating, handball, field hockey, freestyle wrestling, Greco-Roman wrestling, baseball, judo, taekwondo, speed skating, figure skating, and weightlifting. The Seoul Olympic Museum is dedicated to the 1988 Summer Olympics. On 6 July 2011, Pyeongchang was chosen by the IOC to host the 2018 Winter Olympics.

South Korea has won more medals in the Winter Olympics than any other Asian country, with a total of 45 (23 gold, 14 silver, and 8 bronze). At the 2010 Winter Olympics, South Korea ranked fifth in the overall medal rankings. South Korea is especially strong in short track speed skating. Speed skating and figure skating are also popular, and ice hockey is an emerging sport, with Anyang Halla winning their first ever Asia League Ice Hockey title in March 2010.

Seoul hosted a professional triathlon race, which is part of the International Triathlon Union (ITU) World Championship Series in May 2010. In 2011, the South Korean city of Daegu hosted the 2011 IAAF World Championships in Athletics.

The Korean Grand Prix was held from 2010 to 2013, but was not placed on the 2014 F1 calendar.

Domestic horse racing events are also followed by South Koreans and Seoul Race Park in Gwacheon, Gyeonggi-do is located closest to Seoul out of the country's three tracks.

Competitive video gaming, also called Esports (sometimes written e-Sports), has become more popular in South Korea in recent years, particularly among young people. The two most popular games are League of Legends and StarCraft. The gaming scene of South Korea is managed by the Korean e-Sports Association.

See also 

 Outline of South Korea
 State Council of South Korea ("cabinet" of South Korea)

Notes

References

Further reading 

 
 
 
 
 Lew, Yong Ick. The Making of the First Korean President: Syngman Rhee's Quest for Independence (University of Hawai'i Press; 2013); scholarly biography; 576 pages;

External links 

  (Korea.net)
 Korea Tourism Guide website
 Korea National Statistical Office
 South Korea. The World Factbook. Central Intelligence Agency.
 A Country Study: South Korea in the Library of Congress
 
 Korea OECD
 South Korea profile from the BBC News
 South Korea Encyclopædia Britannica entry
 Key Development Forecasts for South Korea from International Futures

 

East Asian countries
Former Japanese colonies
G20 nations
 
Korean-speaking countries and territories
Member states of the United Nations
Northeast Asian countries
OECD members
Republics
States and territories established in 1948